The Schottky effect or field enhanced thermionic emission is a phenomenon in condensed matter physics named after Walter H. Schottky. In electron emission devices, especially electron guns, the thermionic electron emitter will be biased negative relative to its surroundings. This creates an electric field of magnitude F at the emitter surface. Without the field, the surface barrier seen by an escaping Fermi-level electron has height W equal to the local work-function. The electric field lowers the surface barrier by an amount ΔW, and increases the emission current. It can be modeled by a simple modification of the Richardson equation, by replacing W by (W − ΔW). This gives the equation

where J is the emission current density, T is the temperature of the metal, W is the work function of the metal, k is the Boltzmann constant,  qe is the Elementary charge, ε0 is the vacuum permittivity, and AG is the product of a universal constant A0 multiplied by a material-specific correction factor λR which is typically of order 0.5.

Electron emission that takes place in the field-and-temperature-regime where this modified equation applies is often called Schottky emission. This equation is relatively accurate for electric field strengths lower than about 108 V  m−1. For electric field strengths higher than 108 V m−1, so-called Fowler–Nordheim (FN) tunneling begins to contribute significant emission current. In this regime, the combined effects of field-enhanced thermionic and field emission can be modeled by the Murphy–Good equation for thermo-field (T-F) emission. At even higher fields, FN tunneling becomes the dominant electron emission mechanism, and the emitter operates in the so-called "cold field electron emission (CFE)" regime.

Thermionic emission can also be enhanced by interaction with other forms of excitation such as light. For example, excited Cs-vapours in thermionic converters form clusters of Cs-Rydberg matter which yield a decrease of collector emitting work function from 1.5 eV to 1.0–0.7 eV. Due to long-lived nature of Rydberg matter this low work function remains low which essentially increases the low-temperature converter’s efficiency.

References

Condensed matter physics
Electron beam